Spectrum Health Gerber Memorial, in Fremont, Michigan, is a 25-bed acute care hospital that serves all of Newaygo County. The hospital has a cancer care center, intensive care unit, birthing center, and a women's health center that performs mammograms, bone scans, and ultrasounds. Gerber Memorial offers diagnostic imaging, including CT and MRI scans, home health services called Gerber Home Care, and a physician-led medical weight loss program. The hospital's medical wellness center, Tamarac, houses a rehabilitation group, fitness center and medical day spa. Its emergency department operates 24 hours a day.

Services
This health care system offers services that include:

 A 24-hour emergency department 
 Women's Health Center 
 Cancer Center
 Surgical Suites
 Intensive Care Unit  
 Birth Center
 Physical Rehabilitation Services
 Continu-Care
 Mental Health Services 
 Diabetes Education
 Cardiac Rehabilitation
 Diagnostic Imaging
 Nutritional Services
 Specialty Services including Cardiology
 Plastic Surgery
 Wound Clinic (Grant Medical Center)

Health care facilities
Gerber Memorial Hospital - Fremont
Grant Medical Center - Grant
Hesperia Medical Center - Hesperia
Main Street Internal Medicine and Pediatrics - Fremont
Tamarac Wellness Center - Fremont

References

External links
Spectrum Health
Gerber Memorial Health Services
Tamarac Wellness Center

Hospitals in Michigan
Hospital networks in the United States
Newaygo County, Michigan
Hospitals established in 1918